René Peroy (June 22, 1885 – September 17, 1963) was an American fencer. He competed in the team foil event at the 1928 Summer Olympics.

References

External links
 

1885 births
1963 deaths
American male foil fencers
Olympic fencers of the United States
Fencers at the 1928 Summer Olympics
Sportspeople from Paris